Ahsan Ahmed (died on 24 February 2017) was a Bangladesh Nationalist Party politician and a Jatiya Sangsad member representing the Nilphamari-2 constituency.

Career
Ahmed was elected to parliament from Nilphamari-2 as a Jatiya Party candidate in 1996. He was elected mayor of Nilphamari Municipality four times. He was the founding President of Nilphamari District unit of Bangladesh Nationalist Party.

Death
Ahmed died 24 February 2017 in Eden Multicare Hospital, Dhaka, Bangladesh.

References

2017 deaths
Bangladesh Nationalist Party politicians
7th Jatiya Sangsad members
Date of birth missing
Place of birth missing